Dan Laustsen,  (born 15 June 1954) is a Danish cinematographer. He is a member of the Danish Society of Cinematographers and the American Society of Cinematographers. His career spans four decades and he has been nominated and won many prestigious awards, chiefly the Robert Awards. Laustsen has repeatedly collaborated with the Danish director Ole Bornedal on films such as Nightwatch and Just Another Love Story, and internationally with Guillermo del Toro, notably on the films such as Mimic, Crimson Peak, The Shape of Water, and Nightmare Alley (the latter two for which he was nominated for the  Academy Award for Best Cinematography), and with Chad Stahelski for the second, third and fourth films in the John Wick film series. Laustsen is also known for his work on the films Silent Hill and The League of Extraordinary Gentlemen, where the visual side of The League of Extraordinary Gentlemen was hailed as a "visual treat" in Variety.

Personal life 
Laustsen was born in Aalborg, to Aage Aarup Laustsen and Ellen Laustsen. He studied at the National Film School of Denmark (1976–1979) to pursue a career in cinematography. Laustsen has been involved in the production of feature films, documentaries, and advertisements.

Filmography

Films

Television

Documentary films

References

External links

Danish Film Institute profile
Dan Laustsen at the Danish Society of Cinematographers

1954 births
Danish cinematographers
Living people
People from Aalborg
Best Cinematographer Bodil Award winners